Philip Kelly was an English footballer who played as a midfielder. Kelly played for Liverpool doing their inaugural 1892–93 season. He made three appearances for the club during that season, but towards the end of the season he was attacked by two members of an opposing team and suffered a leg injury which ended his playing career. However, he remained active in football and was a trainer for several amateur clubs including West Toxteth Labour AFC and Africa Royal FC. He was also a talent spotter into his seventies for South Liverpool FC.

References

English footballers
Liverpool F.C. players
1869 births
Year of death missing
Footballers from Liverpool
Association football midfielders